Bitsihuitsos Butte is a summit in the U.S. state of Arizona.

Bitsihuitsos is a name derived from the Navajo language meaning "tapered formation at its base.

References

Mountains of Apache County, Arizona
Mountains of Arizona